She Must and Shall Go Free is the first solo studio album from singer-songwriter Derek Webb following his 2003 departure from Caedmon's Call. Named for the last line of a 175-year-old hymn written by William Gadsby, according to Webb, She Must and Shall Go Free "is an emphatic statement about the liberation and ultimate security of the people of God -- the church." A result of Webb's questioning his role in the "church" and its role in culture, She Must and Shall Go Free is a poignant and challenging look at what it means to pursue faith in today's church-laden culture.

Background
After touring with Caedmon's Call for ten years, Webb's first solo record was an effort to ask and answer questions about the church, our role in it and its role in culture. Derek further elaborates:

Reception

She Must and Shall Go Free has received universal acclaim from the six critics to judge the album to date. The album got four five-star and/or ten-star perfect ratings from Christianity Today, Cross Rhythms, New Release Tuesday and The Phantom Tollbooth. Russ Breimeier of Christianity Today cautioned that "It should be mentioned that She Must and Shall Go Free is worded so passionately, some might initially react negatively to it." However, Breimeier noted that "Perhaps most admirable is Derek's tone, which despite his strong criticisms of religion, is very humble. Derek tempers his points nicely with perspective, often pointing the finger at himself and allowing the listeners to convict themselves if the shoe fits – just don't be surprised to find that one size fits all. There's an urgent need for the Christian church to hear the bold and convicting songs of Derek Webb. With a message you need to hear and an album you'll want to hear, She Must and Shall Go Free is already a surefire contender for one of the best albums of 2003." Mike Rimmer of Cross Rhythms noted that "It’s a shame that one of the most important albums of 2003 will probably go largely unnoticed in the general Christian music scene. Why so? Because rather than penning a pile of soft songs about love and grace, Derek Webb has chosen to write songs of such powerful prophetic intention that it’s impossible not to be challenged. The former Caedmon’s Call member tackles head on the state of the Church, its corruption and God’s unchanging sacrificial love. Lyrically a lot of these songs are speaking to the listener from God’s perspective and it’s not always a comfortable listen and yet it’s essential that we are creating music that speaks honestly and creatively about realities." Kevin Davis of New Release Tuesday evoked how the album contents "are all can't miss songs and this is one of my favorite albums ever." Brian A. Smith of The Phantom Tollbooth proclaimed that "With many quality guests (Jars of Clay, Sandra McCracken) and outstanding songwriting, She Shall and Must Go Free is my early nominee for album of the year.  Webb achieves a rarity in music by producing a superior solo effort to that of his former group's recordings."

The album got a half-star deduction from five by Steve Losey of AllMusic, and he wrote noted that "What Webb has accomplished with the opus is a grand statement about love, the church, and life through the eyes of a man that humbly serves Christ." In addition, Losey highlighted that "[t]he tune is sung from Christ's perspective, relaying the need for believers to uplift the church body. The tune is a fitting end to the opus as a piano melody is bolstered by swelling harmonies between Webb and his wife, Sandra McCracken. She Must and Shall Go Free is easily one of the best-written releases of the year. Its richness and worshipful tone could win Webb Artist of the Year honors." Lastly, Ron of Jesus Freak Hideout gave it just a four-star-out-of-five, and he alluded to how he's "...seen this album bring people to tears because of its sheer beauty and brutal honesty rolled into one. Thank you, Derek for pushing Christian Music into this realm." Ron did cautioned that "Don't be turned off by the album's country finger-picking style in the beginning seconds of the album. While at first the musical tone of the album might seem hokey or mellow, the lyrics are far from that. Webb takes a bold step lyrically in calling the church out of its comfort zone".

It is additionally notable for causing controversy in Contemporary Christian Music circles; some Christian retailers refused to stock the album for its use of "strong" language. One of the songs that was the basis for controversy was "Wedding Dress", where Webb describes himself as a "whore" who puts Christ "on like a wedding dress", in an effort portray how often it is difficult to remain faithful to the indelible, but trustworthy God when there are so many tangible and fleeting pleasures available in the present. "Saint and Sinner" also served as a point of contention due to the original line, "I used to be a damned mess but now I look just fine, 'Cause you dressed me up and we drank the finest wine". The word 'damned' was removed from the final version of the album, at the request of two major Christian retailers.

Track listing

Personnel

Band
Derek Webb – vocals, acoustic and electric guitars, banjo (tracks 1, 8, 9)
Kenny Meeks – acoustic and electric guitars, vocals, mandolin on tracks 1, 7, National guitar on tracks 9, 11
Matt Pierson – bass guitar, organ (track 5)
Garett Buell – drums, percussion

Guest musicians
Sara Groves – vocals (track 11)
Dan Haseltine – vocals (track 3)
Matt Odmark – 12-string acoustic guitar (track 3)
Charlie Lowell – B-3 organ (tracks 3 & 8), accordion (track 7)
Stephen Mason – electric guitars (tracks 1 & 3), lap steel
John Catchings - cello (track 11)
Sandra McCracken - vocals (tracks 2, 5, 7, 9, 10)

Technical
 Derek Webb – producer
 Kenny Meeks – producer
 Matt Pierson – additional production
 Garett Buell – additional production

Charts

Notes
 See this article concerning the controversy.

References

2003 debut albums
Derek Webb albums
Albums produced by Matt Pierson